Downieville may refer to:

Downieville, California
Downieville, Colorado